The Inspector of Regimental Colours is an officer of arms responsible for the design of standards, colours and badges of the British Army and of those Commonwealth states where the College of Arms has heraldic jurisdiction. The office was created in 1806, and is currently held by David White, Garter Principal King of Arms.

History
From 1747 the Crown exercised control over the design of the colours carried by regiments of foot of the British Army, which had previously been unregulated and subject to the whim of the colonel of the unit concerned. From that date only devices or badges granted by royal authority were to borne on colours or clothing. A royal warrant dated 19 December 1768 restated these principles and also included cavalry regiments. From 1770 the general officers making inspections of troops were instructed to ensure that colours were in conformity with the 1768 warrant. However, they had little knowledge of the correct emblazoning of heraldic devices, and regiments frequently turned to the officers of the College of Arms for advice on the matter. Delays in issuing new colours due to doubts about the regulation design meant that old ones remained in service long after they had become unserviceable: for example the colours of the 9th (East Norfolk) Regiment of Foot were found in 1798 to be "...nothing but rags, so that no device or number could be seen on them".

In 1803 and 1804 the Board of Ordnance, which was the agency responsible for providing colours to the troops, exchanged correspondence with George Nayler, York Herald, about the delay in issuing colours. It was a result of this that the office of Inspector of Regimental Colours was instituted on 4 June 1806, with Nayler appointed to the post.  Nayler immediately contacted the various regiments seeking details of their colours and ensuring that they were in conformity with the 1768 warrant. From that date the office of the inspector has prepared official paintings and from 1855 assumed responsibility for militia colours and from 1908 those of yeomanry and infantry regiments of the Territorial Force.

The office today
The Inspector of Regimental Colours approves the design of all colours, guidons, standards, cap badges and defence agency insignia. Artwork of the design is executed by an heraldic artist at the College of Arms and is signed by the inspector and by the King.

List of Inspector of Regimental Colours

References

English offices of arms